Aiguo may refer to these places in China:

 Aiguo Subdistrict, Zhanjiang, in Xiashan District, Zhanjiang, Guangdong
 Aiguo Subdistrict, Ulanhot, Inner Mongolia